Project: Horned Owl or , is a light gun shooter for the Sony PlayStation. It was developed by Japanese studio Alfa System with animation studio Movic providing anime cinematics, and was published by Sony Computer Entertainment. The game was released in Japan in 1995, and in North America in 1996. It features character designs by internationally renowned manga artist Masamune Shirow. The game was a stylistic predecessor to Elemental Gearbolt, also developed by Alfa System.

Gameplay

Project: Horned Owl is a basic arcade-style rail shooter, with the action taking place in a first-person perspective. It has the option of utilizing the PlayStation mouse or the Konami light gun. There is a two player co-op as well as single-player mode, both taking place across five city-based levels, where the player controls a giant mech and fights off a variety of mechanized enemies. At the conclusion of each stage there is generally an anime cutscene.

Plot
The events of the game take place in the somewhat futuristic Metro City, where the player controls one of two Horned Owl Armored Mechanized Unit police officers, Hiro Utsumi or Nash Stolar, as they attempt to take down a terrorist organization known as Metalica.

Reception

Next Generation reviewed the PlayStation version of the game, rating it three stars out of five, and stated that "There are a few highlights, including some nicely-detailed and futuristic 3D environments, lengthy missions, and interactive backgrounds. Also, the game has an overwhelming sense of Japanese style which anime fans will likely appreciate. For the most part, however, the game is pretty average – nothing wrong with is, just not that much to get excited about."

Reviews
GameFan #39 (Vol 4, Issue 3) 1996 March
GameFan #46 (Vol 4, Issue 10) 1996 October
Electronic Gaming Monthly (Jul, 1996)
GameFan (Mar, 1996)
NowGamer - Aug 31, 1996
IGN - Nov 25, 1996
GameSpot - Dec 01, 1996
All Game Guide - 1998
The Video Game Critic (Jan 29, 2002)

References

External links

1995 video games
Cooperative video games
Light gun games
PlayStation (console) games
PlayStation (console)-only games
Rail shooters
Video games about police officers
Video games about terrorism
Video games developed in Japan